Enrico Cerracchio (March 14, 1880 – March 20, 1956) was an Italian-born American sculptor and painter. He designed many statues, including the 1925 Sam Houston Monument in Houston, Texas.

Early life
Cerracchio was born on March 14, 1880, in Castelvetere in Val Fortore, Italy. He emigrated to the United States in 1900, and he became a U.S. citizen in 1905.

Career
Cerracchio designed the Sam Houston Monument in Hermann Park, Houston, Texas in 1925. It was "one of the largest equestrian monuments" in the United States at the time. He designed the bust of Governor Miriam A. Ferguson in the Texas State Capitol and that of Confederate General John A. Wharton in the Texas State Cemetery. He also designed statues of Albert Einstein and John Nance Garner. He sculpted a bronze bust of Jesse H. Jones, which was unveiled at a "Jesse H. Jones Day" ceremony in Houston on December 26, 1934.

Personal life and death
With his wife Marion Kowalski, Cerracchio had a son and a daughter.

Cerracchio died on March 20, 1956, in New York City, at age 76. His funeral was held at Our Lady of Mercy's Church in The Bronx.

References

1880 births
1956 deaths
People from the Province of Benevento
People from Houston
Italian emigrants to the United States
People with acquired American citizenship
Sculptors from Texas
Italian male sculptors
19th-century Italian sculptors
20th-century Italian sculptors
20th-century American male artists
Italian male painters
19th-century Italian painters
20th-century Italian painters
American male sculptors
19th-century American sculptors
19th-century Italian male artists
20th-century American sculptors
American male painters
19th-century American painters
20th-century American painters
19th-century American male artists
20th-century Italian male artists